Sultanmuratovo is a rural locality (a selo) and the administrative centre of Sultanmuratovsky Selsoviet, Aurgazinsky District, Bashkortostan, Russia. The population was 706 as of 2010. There are 6 streets.

Geography 
Sultanmuratovo is located 17 km northwest of Tolbazy (the district's administrative centre) by road. Bakayevo is the nearest rural locality.

References 

Rural localities in Aurgazinsky District